Amantis malayana is a species of praying mantis native to Indonesia, on the islands of Bacan, Kaisa, and Sulawesi.

Notes

References

malayana
Mantodea of Southeast Asia
Insects of Indonesia
Fauna of Sulawesi
Insects described in 1915